Daravay Diyu (also Romanized as Daravāy Dīyū; also known as Darāvandī) is a village in Seyfabad Rural District, in the Central District of Khonj County, Fars Province, Iran. At the 2006 census, its population was 136, in 28 families.

References 

Populated places in Khonj County